Beatríz Vilchez Santana (born 29 January 1995) is a Cuban female volleyball player. She is part of the Cuba women's national volleyball team.

She participated in the 2015 FIVB Volleyball World Grand Prix.
On club level she played for Cienfuegos in 2015.

References

1995 births
Living people
Cuban women's volleyball players
Place of birth missing (living people)
Volleyball players at the 2015 Pan American Games
Setters (volleyball)
Pan American Games competitors for Cuba
21st-century Cuban women